St. Nicholas Military Cathedral, popularly known as The Great Nicholas was one of the military cathedrals of the former Russian Empire. It was sited in the Kyiv Fortress overlooking the Dnieper River. 

As a cathedral it was adopted after establishing the Russian Kyiv Fortress in the 19th century. This pentacupolar Ukrainian Baroque building was originally designed by Osip Startsev at the bidding of Hetman Ivan Mazepa to serve as the main church of St. Nicholas's Hermitage traditionally associated with Askold's Grave. The church was consecrated in 1696. It was famed for its dazzling gilded icon screen commissioned by Mazepa. A free-standing Rastrelliesque bell tower was completed in the mid-18th century. 

The Russian Imperial Army became the church's patron in 1831. A set of cannons near the building proclaimed its military associations. In 1934, the Soviets blew up the cathedral, replacing it with a Pioneers Palace.

Struggle for a reconstruction of a temple is growing. The president of Ukraine Viktor Yushchenko supported idea of restoration of a temple.

Now Divine services are carried out at open-air near to a place where there was a temple earlier. A website of parishioners - https://web.archive.org/web/20130925162354/http://mykilsky.org.ua/

References

Links
 

Cathedrals in Kyiv
Demolished churches in Ukraine
Demolished buildings and structures in Kyiv
Former cathedrals in Ukraine
Churches completed in 1696
17th-century Eastern Orthodox church buildings
Buildings and structures demolished in 1934
1696 establishments in Russia
1934 disestablishments in the Soviet Union
Baroque architecture in Kyiv
Baroque church buildings in Ukraine